The Kota Kayang Museum is a museum in Kuala Perlis, Perlis, Malaysia.

History
The museum sits on a 2-hectare of land. Initially, the land was granted from King Syed Alwi to his younger brother Syed Salim bin Syed Muhammad Al-Jafri, who was at that time a senior minister to the King. At the end of the 19th century, Syed Salim constructed a residence for him and his family to stay until 1909 when the Anglo-Siamese Treaty of 1909 was signed. Afterwards, the building became the residence for British Malaya government officers. In 1941–1943, the building was taken over by the Imperial Japanese Army administration. In 1943–1945, the Royal Thai Armed Forces took over the building. After the independence of Malaya in 1957, the building became the official residence of Perlis Chief Minister. In 1991, the building was demolished to make the Kota Kayang Museum. A new building was reconstructed with an exactly similar design to the former building. During the soil excavation work, artifacts from Neolithic period were discovered in the site.

Exhibitions
The museum is divided into three galleries, which are:
 General gallery
 Archaeological gallery
 Kedah and Perlis gallery

See also
 List of museums in Malaysia

References

Museums with year of establishment missing
History museums in Malaysia
Buildings and structures in Perlis